Iqbal Hussain Shaikh (10 September 1934 – 9 January 2015) was a Pakistani cricketer. He played first-class cricket for Hyderabad, National Bank of Pakistan and Sind in twenty-two first-class cricket matches between 1956-57 and 1970-71.

Dr Iqbal Shiekh died in Hyderabad, Sindh at the age of 80.

References

External links
 

1934 births
2015 deaths
Pakistani cricketers
Hyderabad (Pakistan) cricketers
National Bank of Pakistan cricketers
Sindh cricketers
Cricketers from Karachi